Vada Harlene Hayne  (born ) is an American-born academic administrator who was the vice-chancellor and a professor of psychology at the University of Otago in New Zealand, before moving to Western Australia to take up the position of vice-chancellor at Curtin University in April 2021.

She was elected a Fellow of the Royal Society of New Zealand in 2002, and is also a fellow of the Association for Psychological Science.  She was recipient of the Robert L. Fantz Memorial Award from the American Psychological Foundation in 1997.

She was the first female vice-chancellor of the University of Otago, and served in the role from 2011 to 2021.

Early life and education 
Born in Oklahoma and raised in Colorado, Hayne attended Colorado College, where she earned a Bachelor of Arts degree. She continued her education at Rutgers University, completing a MS and PhD while working under the supervision of Carolyn Rovee-Collier. She spent three years as a post-doctoral fellow at Princeton University, and moved to New Zealand in 1992 to join the University of Otago as a lecturer in the psychology department.

Career 
She served on the Academic Council of the Royal Society of New Zealand, the Marsden Fund Council, and the New Zealand National Science Panel. She is an associate editor of Psychological Review and of the New Zealand Journal of Psychology.

Hayne is a leading researcher in memory development in infants, children, adolescents and adults and her work has been cited in legal proceedings both nationally and internationally.

During Hayne’s tenure as Vice-Chancellor, staff numbers (FTE) increased from 3,749 in 2011 to 4,154 in 2020, her last full year as Vice-Chancellor. Over the same period, student numbers decreased from 19,568 (EFTS) to 18,722, partly attributed to the introduction of an enrolment limitation system aimed at slowing growth and “giving priority to higher calibre students”. Hayne prioritised student support and wellbeing and undertook several initiatives to rein in the University’s notorious student drinking culture. Māori enrolments increased significantly during her term including in the medical programme. She was close to her students and thanked them on her departure, writing ‘My life has been made so much richer by knowing you”. The University's operating revenue increased from $592 million to $756 million during her tenure and net assets increased from $1.6 billion to $2.5 billion. Several major capital projects were completed including a refurbished library building and new buildings for music, theatre and performing arts, dentistry, and the Christchurch School of Medicine following significant damage from the Christchurch earthquake.  

Hayne's tenure as vice-chancellor was associated with controversy regarding cuts to the university's humanities department. In 2017, she was accused of intimidating behaviour surrounding cuts to 16 full-time equivalent jobs in the department, and in 2018 following the decision to cut the Art History program.
 In these processes she worked closely with Tony Ballantyne.

In early October 2020, it was reported that Hayne would be finishing her term as Vice-Chancellor at the University of Otago in 2021 to assume the position of Vice Chancellor at Curtin University in Perth; before completing her second five-year term at Otago University. Her successor as Vice Chancellor of the University of Otago is Professor David Murdoch.

Recognition 
In the 2009 New Year Honours, she was appointed an Officer of the New Zealand Order of Merit for services to scientific and medical research.

In 2017, Hayne was selected as one of the Royal Society Te Apārangi's "150 women in 150 words", celebrating the contributions of women to knowledge in New Zealand. In 2021, she was conferred with an honorary Doctor of Laws degree by the University of Otago.

In the 2022 New Year Honours, Hayne was promoted to Companion of the New Zealand Order of Merit, for services to health and wellbeing.

Selected works

References

1960s births
Living people
Academics from Oklahoma
Colorado College alumni
Rutgers University alumni
Princeton University people
American emigrants to New Zealand
New Zealand psychologists
New Zealand women psychologists
Academic staff of the University of Otago
Fellows of the Royal Society of New Zealand
Companions of the New Zealand Order of Merit
Vice-Chancellors of the University of Otago